Wishingbone is the sister album to Subtle'''s first album A New White. It contains remixes and new material with other artists, including Mike Patton, Beck, and Andrew Border of Fog. Included with Wishingbone is a DVD including the videos for "F.K.O.", "The Long Vein of the Law" and "Swanmeat". All the videos on the DVD were animated by a group called SSSR''. Several of the tracks originally appeared on the "F.K.O." and "The Long Vein of The Law" EPs.

CD track Listing
 "Swanmeat" (4:39)
 Beck - "Farewell Ride (Subtle Remix)" (4:55)
 "I Love L.A. II" feat. Hrvatski (3:44)
 "By Hook" (2:30)
 "The Longvein of Voice" feat. Mike Patton (4:25)
 "F.K.O. (Console Remix)" (6:13)
 Ms. John Soda - "I&#8217 (Subtle Remix)" (4:02)
 "Swansong Meat" feat. Fog (9:49)

DVD track listing
 "F.K.O." Release Date: September 10, 2004 (3:50)
 "The Long Vein of the Law" Release Date: October 2, 2004 (3:30)
 "Swanmeat" Release Date: March 1, 2006 (4:34)

References

2006 albums
Lex Records albums
Subtle (band) albums